This World is a current affairs programme which produced by the BBC and broadcast on BBC Two in the United Kingdom, first airing on 4 January 2004. The programme also airs worldwide occasionally through BBC World News on digital services, satellite and cable in many countries. The series is mainly focused on social issues and current affairs stories around the world.

Format

This World was announced in December 2003 on BBC Online and launched in early January 2004, replacing the programme Correspondent.

The website includes additional features and a discussion facility for public comment on the programmes. The BBC streams episodes in RealVideo format via its website for a limited period after they have been shown, and sells them on DVD and VHS by mail order.

Starting from 2009 onwards, the series was available and streaming at BBC iPlayer after the programme broadcast, with a limited period (Replacing with RealVideo and available in United Kingdom only).

Episode list
The division between seasons of This World is based on the UK version of each episode, international episodes are based on its airing on BBC World (currently BBC World News). Subsequent airings of the international version randomly follows the original UK order (Including changes from the original title on some episodes).

2004

2005

2006

2007

2008

2009

2010

2011

2012 (January - May)

2012 (September - December)

2013

2014

2015

2016

2017

2018

2019

Specials

Awards and nominations

Notes

See also

 Panorama
 Our World
 Holidays in the Danger Zone
 Correspondent

References

External links
 (BBC Two, 2010–present)
 
 
This World (BBC World News)

This World at Twitter

2004 British television series debuts
2000s British documentary television series
2010s British documentary television series
2020s British documentary television series
BBC television documentaries
Current affairs shows
English-language television shows